David Mutisya has been the Anglican missionary bishop of  Garissa since 2018.

Mutisya was educated at the High School in Mutito; St. Paul's University, Limuru, Limuru; Trinity College, Bristol; and Nashotah House.
He was a teacher for seven years before becoming a priest.

References

21st-century Anglican bishops of the Anglican Church of Kenya
Anglican bishops of Garissa
Living people
Alumni of Trinity College, Bristol
Nashotah House alumni
Kenyan educators
St. Paul's University, Limuru alumni
Year of birth missing (living people)